{{DISPLAYTITLE:(C6H10O5)n}}
(C6H10O5)n may refer to several polymers sharing the molecular formula:

 Polydextrose
 Glucans:
 Cellulose
 Curdlan
 Glycogen
 Pullulan